Notocotylidae is a family of trematodes in the order Plagiorchiida.

Genera
Catatropis Odhner, 1905
Notocotylus Diesing, 1839
Ogmogaster Jägerskiöld, 1891
Paramonostomum Lühe, 1909

References

Plagiorchiida
Trematode families